The Palmerston Forts are a group of forts and associated structures built during the Victorian period on the recommendations of the 1860 Royal Commission on the Defence of the United Kingdom. The name comes from their association with Lord Palmerston, who was Prime Minister at the time and promoted the idea. 

The structures were built as a response to a perceived threat of a French invasion. The works were also known as Palmerston's Follies as, by the time they were completed the threat (if it had ever existed) had passed, largely due to the Franco-Prussian war of 1870 and technological advancements leading to the guns becoming out-of-date.

As well as new structures, extensive modifications were made to existing defences.

The defences on the Isle of Wight were built to protect the approaches to the Solent, Southampton and Portsmouth. They consist of three separate groups, those at the western end of the island, those at the eastern end, and four built in the Solent.

The information in the tables is taken from documents for each site, from the Victorian Forts website.

Western end

Eastern end

List of forts on the Isle of Wight

Solent
Spitbank Fort
St Helens Fort
Horse Sand Fort
No Man's Land Fort

References

Bibliography
Solent Papers No. 2 The Needles Defences by Anthony Cantwell - 
Solent Papers No. 10 The East Wight Defences by David Moore -

External links
Palmerston Forts Society
Victorian Forts website

Isle of Wight
Forts on the Isle of Wight